The Witches is a 1990 dark fantasy comedy horror film directed by Nicolas Roeg, produced by Jim Henson and starring Anjelica Huston, Mai Zetterling, Rowan Atkinson, and Jasen Fisher. Based on the 1983 book of the same name by Roald Dahl, the story features evil witches who masquerade as ordinary women, and a boy and his grandmother who must find a way to foil their plans.

The film was produced by Jim Henson Productions for Lorimar Film Entertainment as the last theatrical film to be produced by Lorimar before the company was merged into Warner Bros. in 1993. Even though Dahl disliked The Witches for its ending's differing from his source material, the film was very well received by critics, and it developed a cult following over the years.

Plot 
During a vacation with his grandmother Helga in Norway, seven-year-old American boy, Luke Eveshim, is warned about witches, female demons who immensely hate children and use various methods to destroy or transform them. Helga tells Luke what real witches, unlike the ordinary womens have claws instead of fingernails which they hide by wearing gloves, bald heads which they cover by wearing wigs that give them rashes, square feet with no toes which they hide by wearing sensible shoes, a purple tinge in their pupils and a powerful sense of smell which they use to sniff out children. To a witch, clean children stink of dog's droppings; the dirtier the children, the less likely she is to smell them. Helga says her childhood friend, Erica, fell victim to a witch and was cursed to spend the rest of her life trapped inside a painting, aging gradually until finally disappearing a few years earlier.

After Luke's parents are killed in a car accident, Helga becomes Luke's legal guardian and they move to England. While playing outside in a treehouse, Luke is approached by a witch trying to lure him with a snake and a chocolate bar, so he stays in his treehouse for protection and the witch goes away. On Luke's ninth birthday, Helga falls ill with diabetes. Her doctor advises they spend the summer by the sea. At their seaside hotel in Bournemouth, Luke meets and befriends a gluttonous but friendly boy, Bruno Jenkins. Luke unintentionally antagonizes the hotel manager, Mr. Stringer, after his pet mice frighten his maid girlfriend. Also at the hotel is a convention of witches, masquerading as the Royal Society for the Prevention of Cruelty to Children. The Grand High Witch, the all-powerful leader of the world's witches, is attending under the name Eva Ernst.

Luke hides inside the ballroom and spies on the witches' meeting. Eva unveils her latest creation: a magic potion to turn all the world's children into mice, which will be used in confectionery products in sweet shops and candy stores to be purchased using money provided by Eva. Bruno, who was given the potion earlier, is brought into the room, turns into a mouse, and flees. Luke is discovered and runs to Helga in their room but finds her resting after having a diabetes-induced dizzy spell. The witches seize Luke in the room and take him back to the ballroom, where he is forced to drink the potion and turned into a mouse before escaping. He finds Bruno and reunites with Helga, who has since recovered. Luke devises a plan to defeat the witches by sneaking into Eva's room to steal a bottle of the potion, then sneaking into the kitchen and puts it into the soup for the special RSPCC party. Luke and Helga try to get Bruno to his parents, but they do not believe her story and are frightened by the mouse.

Mr. Jenkins orders the soup, though Helga stops him from consuming it. The Jenkinses finally realize Bruno is a mouse when he speaks up. As the witches enter the banquet, Miss Susan Irvine, Eva's long-suffering and mistreated assistant, quits upon being banned from the celebration. The formula turns all the witches into mice, and the staff and hotel guests join in killing them, unknowingly ridding England of its witches. Amidst the chaos, Helga spots the transformed Eva and traps her under a water jug before helpfully pointing her out to Mr. Stringer, who chops her in two with a meat cleaver. She then returns Bruno to his bewildered parents. Luke and Helga return home to where Eva's trunk full of money and an address book of all witches in the United States is delivered, allowing them to plan an operation to wipe out all the witches in America. That night, Miss Irvine, now a good witch (having reformed after Eva's death), drives to Luke and Helga's house and returns Luke to human form, as well as his pet mice and glasses. She leaves to pay Bruno a visit, as Luke and Helga wave goodbye.

Cast 

 Anjelica Huston as Eva Ernst / The Grand High Witch, the all-powerful leader of the world's witches. Huston also voices her rat form.
 Mai Zetterling as Helga Eveshim, an old woman who is an old enemy of the Grand High Witch
 Kristen Steinsland as Child Helga
 Jasen Fisher as Luke Eveshim, Helga's grandson. Fisher also voices his mouse form.
 Rowan Atkinson as Mr. Stringer, the hotel owner/manager
 Bill Paterson as Mr. Jenkins, Bruno's father
 Brenda Blethyn as Mrs. Jenkins, Bruno's mother
 Charlie Potter as Bruno Jenkins, a gluttonous boy who befriends Luke. Potter also voices his mouse form.
 Anne Lambton as Pamela / Woman in Black, an unnamed witch dressed in black who tries to entice Luke with chocolate and a snake
 Jane Horrocks as Miss Susan Irvine, the mistreated assistant of the Grand High Witch
 Sukie Smith as Marlene, a maid at the hotel
 Rose English as Dora, a witch
 Jenny Runacre as Elsie, a witch who works as a maid in the hotel
 Annabel Brooks as Nicola Cuttle, a witch
 Emma Relph as Millie, a witch
 Nora Connolly as Beatrice, a witch
 Rosamund Greenwood as Janice, a witch
 Angelique Rockas as Henrietta, a witch who asks about the Grand High Witch's plan
 Ann Tirard as Lady 1, a witch at meeting
 Leila Hoffman as Lady 2, a witch at meeting
 Jim Carter as Head Chef, the unnamed head of the hotel's kitchen staff
 Roberta Taylor as Witch Chef, a witch who works as a chef in the hotel's kitchens
 Brian Hawksley as Elderly Waiter
 Debra Gillett as Waitress
 Darcy Flynn as Luke's Mother, the late mother of Luke
 Vincent Marzello as Luke's Father, the late father of Luke
 Serena Harragin as Doctor
 Grete Nordrå as Norwegian Witch
 Elsie Eide as Erica
 Merete Armand as Erica's Mother 
 Ola Otnes as Erica's Father 
 Johan Sverre as Policeman
 Arvid Ones as Policeman
 Sverre Rossummoen as Policeman
 Roy Beck as Hotel Guest (uncredited)
 Gary Dean as Maintenance Man (uncredited)
 Barbara Hicks as Witch at Meeting (uncredited)
 Toby Hinson as Afternoon Tea Waiter (uncredited)
 George Holden as Hotel Concierge (uncredited)
 Wendy Lowder as Witch at Meeting (uncredited)
 Sandy Shelton as Hotel Receptionist (uncredited)
 Stella Tanner as Witch at Meeting (uncredited)
 Michael Palin as Witch at Meeting (uncredited)
 John Triplett as Head Waiter (uncredited)

Production 
The Witches was adapted from the children's book of the same title by British author Roald Dahl. It was the final film that Jim Henson personally worked on before his death, the final theatrical film produced by Lorimar Productions, and the last film made based on Dahl's material before his death (both Henson and Dahl died that year).

The following people did special puppeteer work in this film: Anthony Asbury, Don Austen (Bruno's mouse form), Sue Dacre, David Greenaway, Brian Henson, Robert Tygner, and Steve Whitmire (Luke's mouse form). The early portion of the film was shot in Bergen, Norway. Much of the rest was shot on location in England including Cookham, Berkshire and at the Headland Hotel situated on the coast in Newquay, Cornwall.

During the shoot, Rowan Atkinson caused a Mr. Bean style calamity when he left the bath taps running in his room (the frantically knocking porter was told "go away, I'm asleep"). The flood wrote off much of the production team's electrical equipment on the floor below. At the time, Huston was dating Jack Nicholson, who frequently phoned the hotel and sent huge flower bouquets, much to the excitement of the staff.

Director Nicolas Roeg later cut scenes he thought would be too scary for children after seeing his young son's reaction to the original cut.

The elaborate makeup effects for Huston's Grand High Witch took six hours to apply, and another six to remove. The prosthetics included a full face mask, hump, mechanized claws, and a withered collarbone. Huston described a monologue scene she had to do where "I was so uncomfortable and tired of being encased in rubber under hot lights for hours that the lines had ceased to make sense to me and all I wanted to do was cry."

The green vapour used extensively at the end of the film was oil based, and would obscure the contacts in Huston's eyes, which had to be regularly flushed out with water by an expert. Roeg chose a sexy costume for the character to wear and emphasized to Huston that the Grand High Witch should have sex appeal at all times, despite her grotesque appearance in certain scenes of the film.

Dahl was incensed that Henson had changed his original ending in the script. As a gesture of conciliation, Henson offered to film two versions before he made his final choice: the book version where Luke remains a mouse, and the "happier" version where he is transformed back into a human. During the editing process, Dahl watched an early cut of the film with his original ending, and the final scene brought him to tears. However, Henson and Roeg decided to go with the "happier" ending, which resulted in Dahl stating that he would launch a publicity campaign against the film if his name was not removed from the credits. He was only dissuaded from this on the urging of Henson.

Release 
The film was slated to be distributed by Lorimar Television, but when the company dissolved their theatrical distribution operation, it wound up sitting on the shelf for more than a year after filming was completed. The film premiered on 25 May 1990, in London and was scheduled to open the same day in the United States, but following Florida test screenings earlier that year Warner Bros. delayed the American release until August. The film took in $10,360,553 in the United States, and 266,782 in Germany.

Home media 
Warner Home Video first released the film on VHS and LaserDisc in 1991. The second release (and first re release) was on VHS and for the first time on DVD in 1999. Both versions (and any television screenings) use the original open matte negative of the film, instead of matting it down to 1.85:1 (or 1.66:1). It was released on the Blu-ray format in Spain only in 2017. In July 2019, a Blu-ray release from Warner Archive Collection was announced, and was released on 20 August 2019. In August 2020, a Special Edition 30th Anniversary region free Blu-ray release from Warner Bros in the United Kingdom was announced, in special packaging including is a booklet, Original Theatrical release poster, and four art cards, all housed alongside the disc in a collector’s box and was released on 12 October 2020.

Soundtrack 
The film contains an orchestral score composed by Stanley Myers. To date, a soundtrack CD has not been released, and the entire score remains obscure. Throughout the score, the Dies irae appears, highly reminiscent of Berlioz's Symphonie fantastique Movement V, "Dream of a Witches' Sabbath".

Reception

Critical response 
The Witches received critical acclaim. The film holds a 93% approval rating on Rotten Tomatoes based on reviews from 43 critics, with an average rating of 7.6/10. The consensus reads: "With a deliciously wicked performance from Anjelica Huston and imaginative puppetry by Jim Henson's creature shop, Nicolas Roeg's dark and witty movie captures the spirit of Roald Dahl's writing like few other adaptations." On Metacritic, it has an average score of 78 out of 100, based on reviews from 25 critics, indicating "generally favorable reviews".

Roger Ebert gave the film three out of four stars, calling it "an intriguing movie, ambitious and inventive, and almost worth seeing just for Anjelica Huston's obvious delight in playing a completely uncompromised villainess."

Despite the overall positive reception, Roald Dahl disliked the film, and regarded it as "utterly appalling" and although he praised Huston’s performance as the Grand High Witch, he was critical of the ending that contrasted with his book.

Box office 
The film earned £2,111,841 at the UK box office.

Awards 
 Academy of Science Fiction, Fantasy & Horror Films (1991)
 Nominated – Saturn Award for Best Actress (Anjelica Huston)
 Nominated – Saturn Award for Best Make-up (John Stephenson)
 Nominated – Saturn Award for Best Music (Stanley Myers)
 Nominated – Saturn Award for Best Performance by a Younger Actor (Jasen Fisher)
 Nominated – Saturn Award for Best Supporting Actress (Mai Zetterling)

 BAFTA Awards (1991)
 Nominated – BAFTA Award for Best Makeup and Hair (Christine Beveridge)

 Boston Society of Film Critics Awards (1991)
 Won – Boston Society of Film Critics Award for Best Actress (Anjelica Huston)

 Fantasporto (1991)
 Nominated – International Fantasy Film Award for Best Film (Nicolas Roeg)

 Hugo Awards (1991)
 Nominated – Hugo Award for Best Dramatic Presentation

 Los Angeles Film Critics Association Awards (1990)
 Won – Los Angeles Film Critics Association Award for Best Actress (Anjelica Huston)

 National Society of Film Critics Awards (1990)
 Won – National Society of Film Critics Award for Best Actress (Anjelica Huston)

See also 
 The Witches (2020 film), another adaptation of the novel
 List of films featuring diabetes

References

External links 
 
 
 The Witches at Muppet Wiki

1990 films
1990s children's fantasy films
American children's fantasy films
American supernatural horror films
British supernatural horror films
Children's horror films
American dark fantasy films
American fantasy comedy films
British children's fantasy films
Demons in film
Films about curses
Films about mice and rats
Films about orphans
Films about potions
Films about shapeshifting
Films about witchcraft
Films based on children's books
Films based on works by Roald Dahl
Films set in Cornwall
Films set in Norway
Films set in hotels
Films set in England
Films shot in England
Films shot in Norway
Films directed by Nicolas Roeg
Films scored by Stanley Myers
The Jim Henson Company films
Warner Bros. films
Films produced by Jim Henson
1990s English-language films
1990s American films
1990s British films